Justice Sueing Jr. (born March 15, 1999) is an American college basketball player for the Ohio State Buckeyes of the Big Ten Conference. He previously played for the California Golden Bears.

Early life and high school career
Sueing was born and raised in Honolulu, Hawaii and attended Maryknoll School in his hometown for his freshman and sophomore year. Sueing moved to California and transferred to Mater Dei High School for his junior and senior year. During his time at Mater Dei, he played with teammates Bol Bol, Spencer Freedman, and Michael Wang. As a junior, Sueing averaged 10.1 points, 4.8 rebounds, 1.1 assists and 1.4 steals per game. As a senior, Sueing averaged 17 points, 6.6 rebounds, 2.1 assists and 1.5 steals per game.

Recruiting
Sueing was considered a four-star recruit by ESPN and a three-star recruit by 247Sports and Rivals. On February 1, 2017, Sueing committed to playing college basketball for California over offers from Utah and Vanderbilt, among others.

College career

California

Sueing started all but one game in his freshman year, playing in all 32 games and averaging 13.8 points and 5.4 rebounds per game. He scored a career-high 27 points against Washington.

He once again started every game except for one during his sophomore season, playing in all 31 games and averaging 14.3 points and 6 rebounds per game. His best game of the season came against Arizona, when he matched his career-high with 27 points. On April 7, 2019, Sueing announced his intent to transfer from California after former head coach Wyking Jones was fired.

Ohio State
On May 22, 2019, Sueing announced that he was transferring to Ohio State. In his first game at Ohio State, he scored 19 points and had 8 rebounds. As a junior, Sueing averaged 10.7 points and 5.5 rebounds per game.

On November 18, 2021, it was announced that he would miss an extended period of time due to an abdominal injury, which turned out to be the rest of the season. In two games, he averaged 6 points and 3.5 rebounds per game. Following the season, he announced he was taking advantage of the additional season of eligibility granted by the NCAA due to the COVID-19 pandemic.

Career statistics

College

|-
| style="text-align:left;"| 2017–18
| style="text-align:left;"| California
| 32 || 31 || 32.0 || .434 || .311 || .672 || 5.4 || 1.4 || 1.5 || .5 || 13.8
|-
| style="text-align:left;"| 2018–19
| style="text-align:left;"| California
| 31 || 30 || 34.5 || .432 || .302 || .782 || 6.0 || 2.0 || 1.7 || .5 || 14.3
|-
| style="text-align:left;"| 2019–20
| style="text-align:left;"| Ohio State
| style="text-align:center;" colspan="11"|  Redshirt
|-
| style="text-align:left;"| 2020–21
| style="text-align:left;"| Ohio State
| 31 || 31 || 28.3 || .491 || .361 || .750 || 5.5 || 1.5 || .9 || .2 || 10.7
|-
| style="text-align:left;"| 2021–22
| style="text-align:left;"| Ohio State
| 2 || 0 || 15.5 || .385 || .000 || 1.000 || 3.5 || .0 || .5 || .0 || 6.0
|- class="sortbottom"
| style="text-align:center;" colspan="2"| Career
| 96 || 92 || 31.3 || .446 || .313 || .740 || 5.6 || 1.6 || 1.4 || .4 || 12.8

Personal life
Sueing's father, Justice Sr., played college basketball for Hawaii and professionally in Israel and Luxembourg.

References

External links
Ohio State Buckeyes bio
California Golden Bears bio

1999 births
Living people
African-American basketball players
American men's basketball players
Ohio State Buckeyes men's basketball players
California Golden Bears men's basketball players
Sportspeople from Honolulu
Basketball players from Hawaii
21st-century African-American sportspeople